Hamlet, also known as Le Duel d'Hamlet, is a 1900 French film adaptation of an excerpt from the William Shakespeare play Hamlet. It is believed to have been the earliest film adaptation of the play, and starred actress Sarah Bernhardt in the lead role. It was directed by Clément Maurice.

The film is two minutes in length; it features the duel scene between Hamlet and Laertes (Act V).

Hamlet was one of the first films to employ the newly discovered art of pre-recording the actors' voices, then playing the recording simultaneous to the playing of the film. The film was synchronized to a wax cylinder recording, providing the sound, which cylinder is now lost.

Hamlet was shown for first time in The Exposition Universelle on October 1, 1900 in Paris, France.

External links 
 
 

Early sound films
1900 films
French black-and-white films
French silent short films
1900s French-language films
Films based on Hamlet
Films directed by Clément Maurice
French films based on plays
1900s French films